Francisco Javier González Urruticoechea (17 February 1952 – 24 May 2001), known as Urruti, was a Spanish footballer who played as a goalkeeper.

At FC Barcelona, a club known for goalkeepers like Franz Platko, Antoni Ramallets, Juan Velasco and Ricardo Zamora, he became a legend, playing 307 La Liga games over the course of 16 seasons and also representing in the competition Real Sociedad and Español.

Urruti represented Spain in three World Cups. In 2001, he died in a road accident near Barcelona.

Club career
Born in San Sebastián, Gipuzkoa, Urruti played as a junior with Lengokoak before joining Real Sociedad in 1969, spending three full years with the reserve team. For the next La Liga seasons, he maintained an interesting battle for first-choice status with legendary Luis Arconada.

After Arconada finally settled, Urruti moved to RCD Español, where he won the Don Balón award in 1981 (Spanish Footballer of the Year), moving across the city after that campaign to join FC Barcelona.

In his third year, Urruti won the Ricardo Zamora Trophy while playing in all the matches safe one. He was a prominent member of the Catalonia team coached by Terry Venables that won the league in 1985 and then reached the final of the European Cup in the following year; on 25 March 1985, in a game against Real Valladolid, his penalty save against Mágico González effectively clinched the title.

During the second leg of the European Cup semi-final against IFK Göteborg, Urruti successfully protested to the referee about a conceded goal after he spotted the ball had gone out of play – Barcelona were trailing 0–3 from the first leg and the decision kept them in the game. They eventually drew level, and in the subsequent penalty shootout he saved a crucial penalty and then scored one; the final with FC Steaua București, however, was to end in disappointment as, although he saved two shots in the shootout (after 0–0 in regulation), his Romanian counterpart, Helmuth Duckadam, stopped all four.

After Andoni Zubizarreta, another Basque, arrived from Athletic Bilbao in 1986, Urruti was pushed to the bench and only appeared in one league match in his final two seasons combined, later being the club's goalkeeper coach. On 24 May 2001, he died after his car hit the central barrier of a ring road in Esplugues de Llobregat, Barcelona, at just 49; an annual golf tournament, the Memorial Javier Urruti, was subsequently played in his honour.

International career
Urruti played five times for Spain in a two-year span, and was a member of the Spanish squads for the 1978, 1982 and 1986 FIFA World Cups, also being picked for UEFA Euro 1980. His debut came in a friendly with Norway on 29 March 1978, in Gijón; however, his struggles at the club level translated to the international front, as he was never able to replace fellow Basques Arconada and Zubizarreta.

Urruti also earned two caps for the Basque Country national team.

Honours

Club
Barcelona
La Liga: 1984–85
Copa del Rey: 1982–83, 1987–88
Supercopa de España: 1983
Copa de la Liga: 1983, 1986
European Cup Winners' Cup: 1981–82
European Cup runner-up: 1985–86

Individual
Don Balón Award – Spanish Footballer of the Year: 1980–81
Zamora Trophy: 1983–84

References

External links

Biography at Porteros Vascos de Leyenda 

1952 births
2001 deaths
Spanish footballers
Footballers from San Sebastián
Association football goalkeepers
La Liga players
Real Sociedad B footballers
Real Sociedad footballers
RCD Espanyol footballers
FC Barcelona players
Spain under-23 international footballers
Spain amateur international footballers
Spain B international footballers
Spain international footballers
1978 FIFA World Cup players
UEFA Euro 1980 players
1982 FIFA World Cup players
1986 FIFA World Cup players
Basque Country international footballers
Road incident deaths in Spain